Rum is a liquor made by fermenting and then distilling sugarcane molasses or sugarcane juice. The distillate, a clear liquid, is usually aged in oak barrels. Rum is produced in nearly every sugar-producing region of the world, such as the Philippines, where Tanduay is the largest producer of rum globally.

Rums are produced in various grades. Light rums are commonly used in cocktails, whereas "golden" and "dark" rums were typically consumed straight or neat, iced ("on the rocks"), or used for cooking, but are now commonly consumed with mixers. Premium rums are made to be consumed either straight or iced.

Rum plays a part in the culture of most islands of the West Indies as well as the Maritime provinces and Newfoundland, in Canada. The beverage has associations with the Royal Navy (where it was mixed with water or beer to make grog) and piracy (where it was consumed as bumbo). Rum has also served as a medium of economic exchange, used to help fund enterprises such as slavery (see Triangular trade), organized crime, and military insurgencies (e.g., the American Revolution and Australia's Rum Rebellion).

Etymology

The origin of the word "rum" is unclear. The most widely accepted hypothesis is that it is related to "rumbullion", a beverage made from boiling sugar cane stalks, or possibly "rumbustion," which was a slang word for "uproar" or "tumult"; a noisy uncontrollable exuberance, though the origin of those words and the nature of the relationship are unclear. Both words surfaced in English about the same time as rum did (1651 for "rumbullion", and before 1654 "rum").

There have been various other theories:
 It is often connected to the British slang adjective "rum", meaning "high quality", and indeed the collocation "rum booze" is attested. Given the harshness of early rum, this is unlikely.
 Other theories consider it to be short for iterum, Latin for "again; a second time", or arôme, French for aroma.
 That it comes from the large drinking glasses used by Dutch seamen known as rummers, from the Dutch word roemer, a drinking glass.
 That it is related to ramboozle and rumfustian, popular British drinks of the mid-17th century. However, neither was made with rum, but rather eggs, ale, wine, sugar, and various spices. 

Regardless of the original source, the name was already in common use by 1654, when the General Court of Connecticut ordered the confiscations of "whatsoever Barbados liquors, commonly called rum, kill the devil and the like". A short time later in May 1657, the General Court of Massachusetts also decided to make illegal the sale of strong liquor "whether knowne by the name of rumme, strong water, wine, brandy, etc".

In current usage, the name used for a rum is often based on its place of origin.

For rums from places mostly in Latin America where Spanish is spoken, the word ron is used. A ron añejo ("aged rum") is a premium spirit.

Rhum is the term that typically distinguishes rum made from fresh sugar cane juice from rum made from molasses in French-speaking locales like Martinique. A rhum vieux ("old rum") is an aged French rum that meets several other requirements.

Some of the many other names for rum are Nelson's blood, kill-devil, demon water, pirate's drink, navy neater, and Barbados water.
A version of rum from Newfoundland is referred to by the name screech, while some low-grade West Indies rums are called tafia.

History

Precursors and origins
 A liquid identified as rum has been found in a tin bottle found on the Swedish warship Vasa, which sank in 1628.
 An early rum-like drink is brum, which has been produced by the Malay people for thousands of years.
 Marco Polo recorded a 14th-century account of a "very good wine of sugar(cane)" that was offered to him in the area that became modern-day Iran.
 Maria Dembinska states that King Peter I of Cyprus, also called Pierre I de Lusignan (9 October 1328 – 17 January 1369), brought rum with him as a gift for the other royal dignitaries at the Congress of Kraków, held in 1364. This is plausible given the position of Cyprus as a significant producer of sugar in the Middle Ages, although the alcoholic sugar drink named rum by Dembinska may not have resembled modern distilled rums very closely. Dembinska also suggests Cyprus rum was often drunk mixed with an almond milk drink, also produced in Cyprus, called soumada.
 Rum production has been recorded in Brazil in the 1520s.
 Shidhu, a drink produced by fermentation and distillation of sugarcane juice, is mentioned in Sanskrit texts.

Many historians now believe that rum-making found its way to the Caribbean islands along with sugarcane and its cultivation methods from Brazil.
The traditional history of modern-style rum tells of its invention in the Caribbean, in the 17th century, by slaves on sugarcane plantations, who discovered that molasses, a by-product of the sugar refining process, could be fermented into alcohol, and then distilled.
The earliest record, in a 1651 document from Barbados, mentions the island of Nevis in particular:

By the late 17th century rum had replaced French brandy as the exchange alcohol of choice in the triangle trade. Canoemen and guards on the African side of the trade, who had previously been paid in brandy, were now paid in rum.

Colonial North America

After the development of rum in the Caribbean, the drink's popularity spread to Colonial North America. To support the demand for the drink, the first rum distillery in the Thirteen Colonies was set up in 1664 on Staten Island. Boston, Massachusetts had a distillery three years later. The manufacture of rum became early colonial New England's largest and most prosperous industry. New England became a distilling center due to the technical, metalworking and cooperage skills and abundant lumber; the rum produced there was lighter, more like whiskey. Much of the rum was exported, and distillers in Newport, R.I. even made an extra strong rum specifically to be used as a slave currency. Rhode Island rum even joined gold as an accepted currency in Europe for a period of time. While New England triumphed in price and consistency Europeans still viewed the best rums as coming from the Caribbean.

In the 18th century ever increasing demands for sugar, molasses, rum, and slaves led to a feedback loop that intensified the triangular trade. When France banned the production of rum in their New World possessions to end the domestic competition with brandy, New England distillers were then able to undercut producers in the British West Indies by buying cut rate molasses from French sugar plantations. The outcry from the British rum industry led to the Molasses Act of 1733 which levied a prohibitive tax on molasses imported into the Thirteen Colonies from foreign countries or colonies. Rum at this time accounted for approximately 80% of New England's exports and paying the duty would have put the distilleries out of business: as a result, both compliance with and enforcement of the act were minimal. Strict enforcement of the Molasses Act’s successor, the Sugar Act, in 1764 may have helped cause the American Revolution. In the slave trade, rum was also used as a medium of exchange. For example, the slave Venture Smith (whose history was later published) had been purchased in Africa, for four gallons of rum plus a piece of calico.

In "The Doctor's Secret Journal", an account of the happenings at Fort Michilimackinac in northern Michigan from 1769 to 1772 by Daniel Morison, a surgeon's mate, noted that there was not much for the men to do and drinking rum was very popular.  In fact, Ensign Robert Johnstone, one of the officers, "thought proper to turn trader by selling (the) common rum to the soldiers & all others by whom he might gain a penny in this clandestine Manner." To conceal this theft, "he was observed to have filled up several Barrels of common rum with boiling water to make up the Leakage." Ensign Johnstone had no trouble selling this diluted rum.  

The popularity of rum continued after the American Revolution; George Washington insisting on a barrel of Barbados rum at his 1789 inauguration.

Rum started to play an important role in the political system; candidates attempted to influence the outcome of an election through their generosity with rum. The people would attend the hustings to see which candidate appeared more generous. The candidate was expected to drink with the people to show he was independent and truly a republican.

Eventually, the restrictions on sugar imports from the British West Indies, combined with the development of American whiskeys, led to a decline in the drink's popularity in North America.

Naval rum

Rum's association with piracy began with English privateers' trading in the valuable commodity. Some of the privateers became pirates and buccaneers, with a continuing fondness for rum; the association between the two was only strengthened by literary works such as Robert Louis Stevenson's Treasure Island.

The association of rum with the Royal Navy began in 1655 when a Royal Navy fleet captured the island of Jamaica. With the availability of domestically produced rum, the British changed the daily ration of liquor given to seamen from French brandy to rum.

Navy rum was originally a blend mixed from rums produced in the West Indies. It was initially supplied at a strength of 100 degrees (UK) proof, 57% alcohol by volume (ABV), as that was the only strength that could be tested (by the gunpowder test) before the invention of the hydrometer. The term "Navy strength" is used in modern Britain to specify spirits bottled at 57% ABV.

While the ration was originally given neat or mixed with lime juice, the practice of watering down the rum began around 1740. To help minimize the effect of the alcohol on his sailors, Admiral Edward Vernon had the rum ration watered, producing a mixture that became known as grog. Many believe the term was coined in honour of the grogram cloak Admiral Vernon wore in rough weather. The Royal Navy continued to give its sailors a daily rum ration, known as a "tot", until the practice was abolished on 31 July 1970.

Today, a tot (totty) of rum is still issued on special occasions, using an order to "splice the mainbrace", which may only be given by a member of the royal family or, on certain occasions, the admiralty board in the UK, with similar restrictions in other Commonwealth navies. Recently, such occasions have included royal marriages or birthdays, or special anniversaries. In the days of daily rum rations, the order to "splice the mainbrace" meant double rations would be issued.

A legend involving naval rum and Horatio Nelson says that following his victory and death at the Battle of Trafalgar, Nelson's body was preserved in a cask of rum to allow transportation back to England. Upon arrival, however, the cask was opened and found to be empty of rum. The [pickled] body was removed and, upon inspection, it was discovered that the sailors had drilled a hole in the bottom of the cask and drunk all the rum, hence the term "Nelson's blood" being used to describe rum. It also serves as the basis for the term tapping the admiral being used to describe surreptitiously sucking liquor from a cask through a straw. The details of the story are disputed, as many historians claim the cask contained French brandy, whilst others claim instead the term originated from a toast to Admiral Nelson. Variations of the story, involving different notable corpses, have been in circulation for many years. The official record states merely that the body was placed in "refined spirits" and does not go into further detail.

The Royal New Zealand Navy was the last naval force to give sailors a free daily tot of rum. The Royal Canadian Navy still gives a rum ration on special occasions; the rum is usually provided out of the commanding officer's fund and is 150 proof (75%). The order to "splice the mainbrace" (i.e. take rum) can be given by the Queen as commander-in-chief, as occurred on 29 June 2010, when she gave the order to the Royal Canadian Navy as part of the celebration of their 100th anniversary.

Colonial Australia

Rum became an important trade good in the early period of the colony of New South Wales. The value of rum was based upon the lack of coinage among the population of the colony, and due to the drink's ability to allow its consumer to temporarily forget about the lack of creature comforts available in the new colony. The value of rum was such that convict settlers could be induced to work the lands owned by officers of the New South Wales Corps. Due to rum's popularity among the settlers, the colony gained a reputation for drunkenness, though their alcohol consumption was less than levels commonly consumed in England at the time.

Australia was so far away from Britain that the penal colony, established in 1788, faced severe food shortages, compounded by poor conditions for growing crops and the shortage of livestock. Eventually, it was realized that it might be cheaper for India, instead of Britain, to supply the settlement of Sydney. By 1817, two out of every three ships which left Sydney went to Java or India, and cargoes from Bengal fed and equipped the colony. Casks of Bengal Rum (which was reputed to be stronger than Jamaican Rum, and not so sweet) were brought back in the depths of nearly every ship from India. The cargoes were floated ashore clandestinely before the ships docked, by the Royal Marines regiment which controlled the sales. It was against the direct orders of the governors, who had ordered the searching of every docking ship. British merchants in India grew wealthy by sending ships to Sydney "laden half with rice and half with bad spirits".

Rum was intimately involved in the only military takeover of an Australian government, known as the Rum Rebellion. When William Bligh became governor of the colony, he attempted to remedy the perceived problem of drunkenness by outlawing the use of rum as a medium of exchange. In response to Bligh's attempt to regulate the use of rum, in 1808, the New South Wales Corps marched with fixed bayonets to Government House and placed Bligh under arrest. The mutineers continued to control the colony until the arrival of Governor Lachlan Macquarie in 1810.

Asia
Commercial rum production was introduced into Taiwan along with commercial sugar production during the Japanese colonial period. Rum production continued under the Republic of China however it was neglected by Taiwan Tobacco and Liquor Corporation which held the national liquor monopoly. The industry diversified after democratization and the de-monopolization of the Taiwanese alcoholic beverage industry.

Categorization
Dividing rum into meaningful groupings is complicated because no single standard exists for what constitutes rum. Instead, rum is defined by the varying rules and laws of the nations producing the spirit. The differences in definitions include issues such as spirit proof, minimum ageing, and even naming standards.

Mexico requires rum be aged a minimum of eight months; the Dominican Republic, Panama and Venezuela require two years. Naming standards also vary. Argentina defines rums as white, gold, light, and extra light. Grenada and Barbados use the terms white, overproof, and matured, while the United States defines rum, rum liqueur, and flavored rum. In Australia, rum is divided into dark or red rum (underproof known as UP, overproof known as OP, and triple distilled) and white rum.

Despite these differences in standards and nomenclature, the following divisions are provided to help show the wide variety of rums produced.

Regional variations

Within the Caribbean, each island or production area has a unique style. For the most part, these styles can be grouped by the language traditionally spoken. Due to the overwhelming influence of Puerto Rican rum, most rum consumed in the United States is produced in the "Spanish-speaking" style.

 English-speaking areas are known for darker rums with a fuller taste that retains a greater amount of the underlying molasses flavor. Rums from the Bahamas, Antigua, Trinidad and Tobago, Grenada, Barbados, Saint Lucia, Saint Vincent & the Grenadines, Belize, Bermuda, Saint Kitts, the Demerara region of Guyana, and Jamaica are typical of this style. A version called "Rude Rum" or "John Crow Batty" is served in some places and it is reportedly much stronger in alcohol content being listed as one of the 10 strongest drinks in the world, while it might also contain other intoxicants. The term, denoting homemade, strong rum, appears in New Zealand since at least the early 19th century. Jamaican rum was granted geographical indication protection in 2016.
 French-speaking areas are best known for their agricultural rums (rhum agricole). These rums, being produced exclusively from sugar cane juice, retain a greater amount of the original flavor of the sugar cane and are generally more expensive than molasses-based rums. Rums from Haiti, Guadeloupe, and Martinique are typical of this style.
 Areas that had been formerly part of the Spanish Empire traditionally produce añejo rums with a fairly smooth taste. Rums from Colombia, Cuba, the Dominican Republic, Guatemala, Nicaragua, Panama, the Philippines, Puerto Rico, and Venezuela are typical of this style. Rum from the U.S. Virgin Islands is also of this style. The Canary Islands produces a honey-based rum known as ron miel de Canarias which carries a protected geographical designation.

Cachaça is a spirit similar to rum that is produced in Brazil. Some countries, including the United States, classify cachaça as a type of rum. Seco, from Panama, is also a spirit similar to rum, but also similar to vodka since it is triple distilled. Cachaca also comes from sugar cane. 

Mexico produces a number of brands of light and dark rum, as well as other less-expensive flavored and unflavored sugarcane-based liquors, such as aguardiente de caña and charanda. Aguardiente is also the name for unaged distilled cane spirit in some, primarily Spanish-speaking countries since their definition of rum includes at least two years of ageing in wood.

A spirit known as aguardiente, distilled from molasses and often infused with anise, with additional sugarcane juice added after distillation, is produced in Central America and northern South America.

In West Africa, and particularly in Liberia, 'cane juice' (also known as Liberian rum or simply CJ within Liberia itself) is a cheap, strong spirit distilled from sugarcane, which can be as strong as 43% ABV (86 proof). A refined cane spirit has also been produced in South Africa since the 1950s, simply known as cane or "spook".

Within Europe, in the Czech Republic and Slovakia, a similar spirit made from sugar beet is known as Tuzemak.

In Germany, a cheap substitute for genuine dark rum is called Rum-Verschnitt (literally: blended or "cut" rum). This drink is made of genuine dark rum (often high-ester rum from Jamaica), rectified spirit, and water. Very often, caramel coloring is used, too. The relative amount of genuine rum it contains can be quite low since the legal minimum is only 5%. In Austria, a similar rum called Inländerrum or domestic rum is available. However, Austrian Inländerrum is always a spiced rum, such as the brand Stroh; German Rum-Verschnitt, in contrast, is never spiced or flavored.

Grades
The grades and variations used to describe rum depend on the location where rum was produced. Despite these variations, the following terms are frequently used to describe various types of rum:

 Dark rums, also known by their particular colour, such as brown, black, or red rums, are classes a grade darker than gold rums. They are usually made from caramelized sugar or molasses. They are generally aged longer, in heavily charred barrels, giving them much stronger flavors than either light or gold rums, and hints of spices can be detected, along with a strong molasses or caramel overtone. They commonly provide substance in rum drinks, as well as colour. In addition, dark rum is the type most commonly used in cooking. Most dark rums come from areas such as Jamaica, Bahamas, Haiti, and Martinique.
 Flavored rums are infused with flavors of fruits, such as banana, mango, orange, pineapple, coconut, starfruit or lime. These are generally less than 40% ABV (80 proof). They mostly serve to flavor similarly themed tropical drinks but are also often drunk neat or with ice. This infusion of flavors occurs after fermentation and distillation. Various chemicals are added to the alcohol to simulate the taste of food.
 Gold rums, also called "amber" rums, are medium-bodied rums that are generally aged. These gain their dark colour from aging in wooden barrels (usually the charred, white oak barrels that are the byproduct of Bourbon whiskey). They have more flavor and are stronger tasting than light rum and can be considered midway between light rum and the darker varieties.
 Light rums, also referred to as "silver" or "white" rums, in general, have very little flavor aside from a general sweetness. Light rums are sometimes filtered after aging to remove any colour. The majority of light rums come from Puerto Rico. Their milder flavors make them popular for use in mixed drinks, as opposed to drinking them straight. Light rums are included in some of the most popular cocktails including the Mojito and the Daiquiri.
 Overproof rums are much higher than the standard 40% ABV (80 proof), with many as high as 75% (150 proof) to 80% (160 proof) available. Two examples are Bacardi 151 or Pitorro moonshine. They are usually used in mixed drinks.
 Premium rums, as with other sipping spirits such as Cognac and Scotch whisky, are in a special market category. These are generally from boutique brands that sell carefully produced and aged rums. They have more character and flavor than their "mixing" counterparts and are generally consumed straight.
 Spiced rums obtain their flavors through the addition of spices and, sometimes, caramel. Most are darker in colour, and based on gold rums. Some are significantly darker, while many cheaper brands are made from inexpensive white rums and darkened with caramel colour. Among the spices added are cinnamon, rosemary, absinthe/aniseed, pepper, cloves, and cardamom.

Production method
Unlike some other spirits, rum has no defined production methods. Instead, rum production is based on traditional styles that vary between locations and distillers.

Harvesting
Sugarcane is traditionally collected by sugarcane machete cutters who cut the cane near to the ground, where the largest concentration of sugars is found, before lopping off the green tips. A good cutter can cut three tons of cane per day on average, but this is a small fraction of what a machine can cut, therefore mechanised harvesting is now utilized.

Extraction
Sugarcane comprises around 63% to 73% water, 12% to 16% soluble sugar, 2% to 3% non-sugars, and 11% to 16% fiber. To extract the water and sugar juice, the harvested cane is cleaned, sliced into small lengths, and milled (pressed).

Fermentation

Most rum is produced from molasses, which is made from sugarcane. A rum's quality is dependent on the quality and variety of the sugar cane that was used to create it. The sugar cane's quality depends on the soil type and climate that it was grown in. Within the Caribbean, much of this molasses is from Brazil.
A notable exception is the French-speaking islands, where sugarcane juice is the preferred base ingredient. In Brazil itself, the distilled alcoholic drink derived from cane juice is distinguished from rum and called cachaça.

Yeast and water are added to the base ingredient to start the fermentation process.
While some rum producers allow wild yeasts to perform the fermentation, most use specific strains of yeast to help provide a consistent taste and predictable fermentation time. Dunder, the yeast-rich foam from previous fermentations, is the traditional yeast source in Jamaica.
"The yeast employed will determine the final taste and aroma profile,"
says Jamaican master blender Joy Spence.
Distillers that make lighter rums, such as Bacardi, prefer to use faster-working yeasts.
The use of slower-working yeasts causes more esters to accumulate during fermentation, allowing for a fuller-tasting rum.

Fermentation products like 2-ethyl-3-methyl butyric acid and esters like ethyl butyrate and ethyl hexanoate give rise to the sweetness and fruitiness of rum.

Distillation
As with all other aspects of rum production, no standard method is used for distillation.
While some producers work in batches using pot stills, most rum production is done using column still distillation.
Pot still output contains more congeners than the output from column stills, so produces fuller-tasting rums.

Ageing and blending
Many countries require rum to be aged for at least one year. This ageing is commonly performed in used bourbon casks, but may also be performed in other types of wooden casks or stainless-steel tanks. The ageing process determines the colour of the rum. When aged in oak casks, it becomes dark, whereas rum aged in stainless steel tanks remains virtually colourless.

Due to the tropical climate, common to most rum-producing areas, rum matures at a much higher rate than is typical for whisky or brandy. An indication of this higher rate is the angels' share, or the amount of product lost to evaporation. While products aged in France or Scotland see about a 2% loss each year, tropical rum producers may see as much as 10%.

After ageing, rum is normally blended to ensure a consistent flavour, the final step in the rum-making process. During blending, light rums may be filtered to remove any colour gained during ageing. For dark rums, caramel may be added for colour.

There have been attempts to match the molecular composition of aged rum in significantly shorter time spans with artificial aging using heat and light.

In cuisine

Besides rum punches, cocktails such as the Cuba libre and daiquiri have stories of their invention in the Caribbean. Tiki culture in the U.S. helped expand rum's horizons with inventions such as the mai tai and zombie. Other cocktails containing rum include the piña colada, a drink made popular in America by Rupert Holmes' song "Escape", and the mojito. Cold-weather drinks made with rum include the rum toddy and hot buttered rum.

A number of local specialties also use rum, including Bermuda's Dark 'n' Stormy (Gosling's Black Seal rum with ginger beer), the Painkiller from the British Virgin Islands, and a New Orleans cocktail known as the Hurricane. Jagertee is a mixture of rum and black tea popular in colder parts of Central Europe and served on special occasions in the British Army, where it is called Gunfire. Ti' Punch, French Creole for "petit punch", is a traditional drink in parts of the French West Indies.

Rum may also be used as a base in the manufacture of liqueurs and syrups, such as falernum and most notably, Mamajuana.

Rum is used in a number of cooked dishes as a flavoring agent in items such as rum balls or rum cakes. It is commonly used to macerate fruit used in fruitcakes and is also used in marinades for some Caribbean dishes. Rum is also used in the preparation of rumtopf, bananas Foster, and some hard sauces. Rum is sometimes mixed into ice cream, often with raisins, and in baking, it is occasionally used in Joe Froggers, a type of cookie from New England.

See also

 Alcohol (drug)
 Cachaça
 Charanda
 Clairin
 List of rum producers
 Rhum agricole
 Mamajuana
 Rum cake
 Rum cocktails
 Rum row
 Rum-running
 Tafia

References

Sources

Further reading
 
 
 
  (Introduction)
  (extract)

External links

 

 
Caribbean drinks
Sugar